Andréi Ivánovich Kobýla was the earliest-known agnatic ancestor of the Romanov dynasty of Russian tsars and many Russian noble families.

Biography 
This boyar was documented in contemporary chronicles only once, in 1347, when he was sent by Grand Duke Simeon the Proud to Tver with the purpose of meeting Simeon's bride, who was a daughter of Alexander I of Tver. Neither his pedigree nor exact position at court are known, hence speculation abounds. 

Later generations assigned to Kobyla the most illustrious pedigrees. They first claimed that he had arrived in Moscow in 1341 from Prussia, where his father, Glanda Kambila, was a famous Prussian holdout against the conquest of Balts by the Teutonic knights. Teutonic Order records do speak of a rebel named Glande. 

In the late 17th century, after the Romanov's elevation to Russia's ruling dynasty, this origin story was replaced by a more grandiose lineage. A fictional line giving Andrei Kobyla's descent from Julius Caesar was published. In fact, it is quite likely that Kobyla's origins were far less illustrious. A hint as to his true origins lie in his sobriquet, Kobyla, which functioned more as a nickname than as a strictly hereditary surname. Not only is Kobyla Russian for mare, but Kobyla's known relatives were also known by nicknames derived from horses and other domestic animals, thus suggesting descent from some everyday functionary of a noble estate, such as the Ratshid royal equerries.

16th-century genealogies mention five of Andrei's sons: Simeon Zherebets, Alexander Yolka, Vasily Vantey, Gavrila Gavsha, and Fyodor Koshka.

House of Romanov
14th-century Russian people